The Roman Catholic Archdiocese of Dakar is the Metropolitan See for the Ecclesiastical province of Dakar in Senegal.

History
 February 2, 1863: Established as Apostolic Vicariate of Senegambia from the Apostolic Vicariate of Two Guineas and Senegambia in Gabon 
 January 27, 1936: Renamed as Apostolic Vicariate of Dakar 
 September 14, 1955: Promoted as Metropolitan Archdiocese of Dakar

Special churches
The seat of the archbishop is Cathédrale Notre Dame des Victoires in Dakar. There is a Minor Basilica at Basilique Notre-Dame de la Délivrance in Poponguine.

Bishops

Ordinaries

Vicars Apostolic of Senegambia
 Magloire-Désiré Barthet (1889-1898)
 Joachim-Pierre Buléon, C.S.Sp. (1899-1900)
 François-Nicolas-Alphonse Kunemann, C.S.Sp. (1901-1908)
 Hyacinthe-Joseph Jalabert, C.S.Sp. (1909-1920)
 Louis Le Hunsec, C.S.Sp. (1920-1926), appointed Superior General of the Congregation of the Holy Spirit

Vicars Apostolic of Dakar
 Auguste Grimault, C.S.Sp. (1927-1946)
 Marcel-François Lefebvre, C.S.Sp. (1947-1955 see below)

Archbishops of Dakar
 Marcel-François Lefebvre, C.S.Sp. (see above 1955–1962), appointed Archbishop (personal title) of Tulle, France
 Hyacinthe Thiandoum (1962-2000) (Cardinal in 1976)
 Théodore-Adrien Sarr (2000-2014) (Cardinal in 2007)
 Benjamin Ndiaye (2014–present)

Auxiliary Bishop
Georges-Henri Guibert, C.S.Sp. (1949-1960), appointed Bishop of Saint-Denis-de-La Réunion

Suffragan Diocese
 Kaolack
 Kolda
 Saint-Louis du Sénégal
 Tambacounda
 Thiès
 Ziguinchor

See also

 Roman Catholicism in Senegal
 List of Roman Catholic dioceses in Senegal

References

Sources
 GCatholic.org

Dakar
Dakar
 
A